Vescovo is an Italian surname. Notable people with the surname include: 

 Camillo Vescovo (born 1960), Italian ski mountaineer
 Rob Vescovo (born 1977), American politician
 Victor Vescovo (born 1964/65), American financier and undersea explorer

Italian-language surnames